"Bittersweet" is a song performed by American singer Fantasia from her  third studio album, Back to Me. The song was released on May 11, 2010 as the lead single from the album.

Fantasia's work on "Bittersweet" won her the Grammy Award for Best Female R&B Vocal Performance at the 2011 Grammy Awards, the last song to win this category.  "Bittersweet" was also nominated for Best R&B Song. The song also won the 2011 NAACP Image Award for Best Song.

Composition and critical reception
"Bittersweet" is a down-tempo R&B song which also derives from soul music.  According to Margaret Wappler of the Los Angeles Times, its introduction is composed of "anguished" piano notes and "gut-socking" moans. The song lyrically sees its protagonist reminiscing on a past love.

Margaret Wappler of the Los Angeles Times said Fantasia's best moment on Back to Me was "Bittersweet", stating that it was "smartly chosen as the album’s first single." Mikael Wood of Entertainment Weekly recommended the song as a download from the album, calling it an "old-school slow jam." On songs such as "Bittersweet", Mariel Concepcion of Billboard said "her distinct voice is most enjoyable when singing heartfelt ballads." Jonathan Keefe of Slant Magazine was less enthusiastic of the song, commenting that it "barely has a melodic line" and that it "just lets Fantasia do what she can with its bathetic series of clichés."

Promotion
To promote the track, Fantasia has appeared on shows such as American Idol, Lopez Tonight and Good Morning America.

Music video
The music video for Bittersweet has been shot and premiered Friday June 25 on Vevo. The video was directed by Lenny Bass and features professional football player Devin Thomas as Fantasia's love interest.

Track listing
 Digital download
 "Bittersweet" – 4:02

Charts
"Bittersweet" has peaked at number 7 on the U.S. Billboard Hot R&B/Hip-Hop Songs and number 74 on the U.S. Billboard Hot 100 chart. It has sold 90,000 copies in the U.S.

Weekly charts

Year-end charts

References

External links
 

2010s ballads
2010 singles
Fantasia Barrino songs
Songs written by Claude Kelly
Songs written by Chuck Harmony
Song recordings produced by Chuck Harmony
2010 songs
J Records singles
Contemporary R&B ballads
Soul ballads
Torch songs